Temeka Rochelle Johnson (born September 6, 1982) is a former American professional basketball player. Her primary position was point guard.

High school years
Johnson attended Bonnabel High School in Kenner, Louisiana.

College years
Johnson played for the LSU Lady Tigers from 2001 to 2005, graduating from the school in 2005.  She broke LSU's career assist record.  She was also teammates with Seimone Augustus.

 AP All-American honorable mention (2004, 2003, 2002)
 All-SEC First Team (2005, 2004)
 All-SEC Third Team (2003)
 SEC Tournament MVP (2003)
 SEC All-Tournament Team (2003, 2002)

LSU statistics
Source

WNBA career
Johnson was selected 6th overall in the 2005 WNBA Draft. Upon joining the Mystics she was doubted for being too short to play professional basketball. That same year she would walk away with the 2005 WNBA Rookie of the Year award. In addition, she ranked 2nd in the league in assists. At the beginning of the 2006 season, she was traded to the Los Angeles Sparks, and during the 2009 off-season, to the Phoenix Mercury who went on to win the WNBA Championship later that year. On January 12, 2012, Johnson was traded to the Tulsa Shock for Andrea Riley. On February 7, 2013, Johnson signed with the Seattle Storm to fill a gap at the starting point guard position left by Sue Bird who was out for the whole season while recovering from knee surgery. In her second season with the Storm, Johnson became the shortest player in WNBA history to record a triple-double with a performance of 13 points, 11 assists and a career-high 10 rebounds while standing only 5'3". On March 17, 2015, it was announced that Johnson was released by the Storm. Johnson signed once again with the Los Angeles Sparks on March 23, 2015. While playing with the Sparks in the 2015 season, Johnson scored her 2500th career point and recorded her 300th career steal.

International career
Johnson was a member of the gold medal 2003 USA World Championship Young Women Team in Šibenik, Croatia.

Overseas career
In the 2005–06 WNBA off-season, Johnson played in both Israel and Poland for Bnei Yehuda and Lotos VBW Clima Gdynia. She played for Raanana Hasharon in Israel during the 2008–09 WNBA off-season. In the 2009–10 WNBA off-season, Johnson played in Israel for Maccabi Bnot Ashdod. From 2011 to 2013, Johnson played two off-seasons in Russia for Dynamo Kursk. In the 2013–14 WNBA off-season, Johnson played for another Russian team, Nadezhda Orenburg. In October 2015, Johnson signed with AGÜ Spor for the 2015–16 WNBA off-season. In November 2016, Johnson signed once again with Maccabi Bnot Ashdod for the 2016–17 WNBA off-season.

References

External links
 WNBA Player Profile

 

1982 births
Living people
American expatriate basketball people in France
American expatriate basketball people in Israel
American expatriate basketball people in Poland
American expatriate basketball people in Russia
American expatriate basketball people in Turkey
American women's basketball players
Basketball players from New Orleans
Los Angeles Sparks players
LSU Lady Tigers basketball players
Phoenix Mercury players
Point guards
Seattle Storm players
Tulsa Shock players
Washington Mystics draft picks
Washington Mystics players